Ejike Collins Ngwoke (born 12 January 1995 in Enugu) is a Nigerian professional footballer who plays as a defensive midfielder. Although his favorite position is defensive midfielder, Ejike also play as an attacking/left midfielder. He is a free agent currently.

Career
Ngwoke played in his native Nigeria for Lobi Stars until 2014. He then moved to Jordan to play for Al-Sheikh Hussein FC.

Muktijoddha Sangsad KC
Collins then moved to Bangladesh to play for Bangladesh Premier League club Muktijoddha Sangsad KC during the 2017–18 Bangladesh Football Premier League. He made his debut for the club on 4 August 2017 in a Bangladesh Premier League match against Rahmatganj MFS. He came in as a substitute in the 83 minute replacing Islam Mohamed.Muktijoddha Sangsad KC won 3–2.

Club Industriel de Kamsar
He joined Guinean second-tier club Club Industriel de Kamsar in September 2018.

After a trail with Yenicami Ağdelen, he couldn't join due to late registration.

Honours 
 Al-Sheikh Hussein FC
 1st ever Quarter finalist Jordan FA Cup : 2014
 Muktijoddha Sangsad KC
 Semi final Walton Cup : 2016

References

External links 
 

Living people
1995 births
Footballers from Enugu
Nigerian footballers
Nigerian expatriate footballers
Nigeria international footballers
Association football midfielders
Expatriate footballers in Bangladesh
Bangladesh Football Premier League players
Nigerian expatriate sportspeople in Bangladesh